The Battle of Høljarast Bridge was a military engagement between Norwegian and German forces during the Norwegian Campaign. The battle ended with a partial Norwegian defeat as they were unable to hold their lines against German advance. Norwegians managed to withdraw in order destroying the strategic bridge so Germans would not be able to use it. Germans soon built an improvised bridge in the same place they named "Brandenburg".

See also 

 List of Norwegian military equipment of World War II
 List of German military equipment of World War II

References

External links
Valdres, 1940
 

1940 in Norway
Norwegian campaign
April 1940 events